The Tataskweyak Cree Nation (Formerly known as Split Lake Cree First Nation in English) is a First Nations band government whose primary community is located at Split Lake, Manitoba, on the Nelson River system. Despite its remote location, it is serviced by Provincial Road 280, which connects the community to Thompson.

The Split Lake band have entered into an agreement with Manitoba Hydro regarding potential hydroelectric development at Keeyask Rapids. 

Its main reserve is Split Lake 171.

References

External links 
 Map of Split Lake 171 (part in Census Division No. 22) at Statcan
 Map of Split Lake 171 (part in Census Division No. 23) at Statcan
 Tataskweyak Cree Nation

Keewatin Tribal Council
First Nations governments in Manitoba
Cree governments
First Nations in Northern Region, Manitoba